The 1927 Cork Senior Football Championship was the 39th staging of the Cork Senior Football Championship since its establishment by the Cork County Board in 1887. The draw for the opening round fixtures took place on 23 February 1927. The championship began on 27 March 1927 and ended on 23 October 1927.

Macroom entered the championship as the defending champions.

On 23 October 1927, University College Cork won the championship following a 3-03 to 1-00 defeat of Macroom in the final at the Cork Athletic Grounds. This was their second championship title overall and their first title since 1920.

Results

Geraldines V Nils
Nicks V UCC

Second round

Semi-finals

Final

References

Cork Senior Football Championship